The Commonwealth of Massachusetts is often categorized politically as progressive and liberal. It is generally considered the most left-leaning state in the US, and all of the state’s Congressional representatives and both US senators are Democrats, while Democrats also form the large majority of the state’s legislature, though the state has a history of electing Republican governors. As with most states, the two main political parties are the Democratic Party and the Republican Party.

History

Antebellum 
In the early 19th century, Boston was a center of the socially progressive movements in antebellum New England. The abolitionist, women's rights, and temperance movements all originated in New England, and Boston became a stronghold of such movements. Boston also flourished culturally with the works of Ralph Waldo Emerson and Nathaniel Hawthorne becoming popular. The belief in social progress was strongly influenced by the Second Great Awakening sweeping the Northern United States at the time, and Boston gained a reputation for radical politics. During the Civil War, the Radical Republicans had strong support from Massachusetts. Tension, however, existed between more moderate and conservative Bostonians and the abolitionists. Abolitionist William Lloyd Garrison was almost killed by a mob when his office was raided in 1837.

The state was politically dominated by Federalists from the late 1790s until the late 1820s, a longer period than in other states. Massachusetts voted for the Federalist presidential candidate in 1808, 1812, and 1816. From then until the 1850s, it was dominated by the Whig Party, which presented a socially liberal but pro-business agenda, against a fractured Democratic Party and occasional single-issue third parties. In 1850, the Democrats made common cause with the abolitionist Free Soil Party to gain control of both the governor's seat and the state legislature for the first time.  This coalition did not last, and the existing party structures were effectively wiped out by the 1853 landslide victory of the Know Nothing movement, which enacted major reform legislation during its three years in power.  The Republican Party was organized in 1854, and came to power in 1857.  It would dominate the state's politics until the 1930s, first as the reform party opposed to slavery, then as a pro-business, generally anti-labor and temperance-oriented party.  The reorganized Democratic Party remained largely ineffective during this time, typically gaining power only when the Republicans overreached on issues such as temperance.

Gilded Age and Progressive Era 
After the Civil War, radical politics faded in popularity. With Reconstruction failing, the progressive climate gave way into a conservative one, and civil rights groups disappeared as Boston melted into the mainstream of American politics. During the first half of the 1900s, Boston was socially conservative and strongly under the influence of Methodist minister J. Frank Chase and his New England Watch and Ward Society, founded in 1878. In 1903, the Old Corner Bookstore was raided and fined for selling Boccaccio's Decameron. Howard Johnson's got its start when Eugene O'Neill's Strange Interlude was banned in Boston, and the production had to be moved to Quincy. In 1927, works by Sinclair Lewis, Ernest Hemingway, John Dos Passos, and Sherwood Anderson were removed from bookstore shelves. "Banned in Boston" on a book's cover could actually boost sales. Burlesque artists such as Sally Rand needed to modify their act when performing at Boston's Old Howard Theater. The clean version of a performance used to be known as the "Boston version." By 1929, the Watch and Ward society was perceived to be in decline when it failed in its attempt to ban Theodore Dreiser's An American Tragedy, but as late as 1935 it succeeded in banning Lillian Hellman's play The Children's Hour. Censorship was enforced by city officials, notably the "city censor" within the Boston Licensing Division. That position was held by Richard J. Sinnott from 1959 until the office was abolished on March 2, 1982. In modern times, few such puritanical social mores persist.  Massachusetts has since gained a reputation as being a politically liberal state and is often used as an archetype of liberalism, hence the usage of the phrase "Massachusetts liberal".

In the 1920s, Democrats Joseph Buell Ely (governor in the early 1930s) and David I. Walsh (governor in the 1910s, then US Senator) successfully organized a wide array of liberal Yankees, Irish Americans, and other immigrant groups (eastern Europeans, Italians, Greeks, and French Canadians among them) into an effective party structure, that has since come to dominate the state's political establishment.  This goal had eluded Irish and Boston interests led by James Michael Curley and John F. "Honey Fitz" Fitzgerald, who were a significant but not always dominating force in the party.  Fitzgerald's daughter Rose married Joseph P. Kennedy Sr., beginning the Kennedy family dynasty.

Postwar 
In the 1970s and 1980s, Massachusetts was the center of the anti-nuclear power movement, opposition to the continuing Cold War arms race, and Ronald Reagan’s policies of intervention in Central America. Political figures who opposed nuclear power included Senator Edward Kennedy, Senator John Kerry (Vietnam veteran), Tip O’Neill (Speaker of the House), and Michael Dukakis (Governor). The Montague Nuclear Power Plant was to consist of two 1,150-megawatt nuclear reactors to be located in Montague, Massachusetts.  The project was proposed in 1973 and canceled in 1980, after $29 million was spent on the project. In 1974, farmer Sam Lovejoy disabled the weather-monitoring tower which had been erected at the Montague site. Lovejoy's action galvanized local public opinion against the plant.

Politics

State

Massachusetts has a bicameral state legislature, collectively known as the Massachusetts General Court.  It is made of the 160-seat Massachusetts House of Representatives and the 40-seat Massachusetts Senate. The Massachusetts Democratic Party holds large supermajorities in both houses.

The Governor of Massachusetts is the executive of the state government, and is elected every four years. Prior to 1966, governors served two-year terms, and prior to 1920, governors served one-year terms. The Massachusetts Supreme Judicial Court is the highest court in the commonwealth. Despite the state's strong Democratic lean, Republicans have been able to win the governor's office. They held it almost continuously from 1991 to 2023 with the only exception being Democrat Deval Patrick (2007–2015). Although, they have mostly been among the most moderate Republican politicians in the nation, especially William Weld. Two of these governors, Paul Cellucci and Jane Swift, took office when their predecessors resigned to take other positions. Massachusetts’ most recent Republican governor was centrist Republican Charlie Baker, who was re-elected to his second term in 2018 with 66.6% of the vote.

Federal

Subsequent to the 2010 national census and the 2011 reallocation of United States House of Representatives districts among the states, Massachusetts has nine seats, all of which are held by Democrats. Republicans have not won a house since 1994. Massachusetts currently has 9 House districts In the 118th Congress, all 9 are held by Democrats. There are as follows:

Massachusetts's 1st congressional district represented by Richard Neal (D)
Massachusetts's 2nd congressional district represented by Jim McGovern (D)
Massachusetts's 3rd congressional district represented by Lori Trahan (D)
Massachusetts's 4th congressional district represented by Jake Auchincloss (D)
Massachusetts's 5th congressional district represented by Katherine Clark (D)
Massachusetts's 6th congressional district represented by Seth Moulton (D)
Massachusetts's 7th congressional district represented by Ayanna Pressley (D)
Massachusetts's 8th congressional district represented by Stephen Lynch (D)
Massachusetts's 9th congressional district represented by Bill Keating (D)

Massachusetts is part of the United States District Court for the District of Massachusetts in the federal judiciary. The district's cases are appealed to the Boston-based United States Court of Appeals for the First Circuit.

Massachusetts has two Democratic U.S. Senators, belonging to Class 1 and 2, they are Elizabeth Warren and Ed Markey, respectively, both serving since 2013.

In presidential elections, Massachusetts supported Republicans from 1856 through 1924, barring 1912, where due to vote splitting between former Republican President Theodore Roosevelt running as a Progressive against incumbent Republican President William Howard Taft, Democratic candidate Woodrow Wilson ended up becoming the first Democratic presidential candidate to win Massachusetts, though only winning with a plurality of only 35.53% of the vote. From 1928 up until the 1960s, it was considered a Democratic-leaning swing state. During the 1972 presidential election, Massachusetts was the only state to give its electoral votes to George McGovern, the Democratic nominee (the District of Columbia also voted for McGovern). Following the resignation of President Richard Nixon in 1974, two famous bumper stickers were sold in Boston, one saying "Don't blame me, I'm from Massachusetts," and the other read "Nixon 49, America 1". Since 1928, the state has been carried by a Republican presidential candidate four times, for Dwight D. Eisenhower in 1952 and 1956, and in 1980, when Ronald Reagan unseated incumbent Jimmy Carter and in his 1984 landslide. However, in the latter two elections, Reagan's margin of victory in Massachusetts was the smallest of any state he carried.

More recently, it has shifted to the Democratic Party further, voting for the Democratic presidential candidate in every election since 1988. Republicans have not carried any county since that election. In the 2004 election, Massachusetts gave native son John Kerry 61.9% of the vote and his largest margin of victory in any state. Barack Obama carried the state with 61.8% of the vote in 2008 and 60.7% in 2012. In 2016, Hillary Clinton won the state with 61.0% of the vote, with Massachusetts trending to the left, opposite the nation. In 2020, Massachusetts was the second-most Democratic state, following Vermont. Joe Biden won 65.6% of the vote, the highest share for any candidate since Lyndon Johnson's landslide victory in 1964.

The Democratic shift is also evident on the congressional ballot. In 2020, four of Massachusetts’ nine U.S. House Representatives ran unopposed. In the same year’s U.S. Senate election, incumbent Ed Markey received two-thirds of the vote, even slightly surpassing Biden’s vote percentage.

|}

Party registration
 

Unenrolled voters make up a majority of the state. The only county with a plurality of Democratic registered voters is Suffolk, home to the state’s capital and most-populous city, Boston. The percentage of Unenrolled voters statewide is on the rise while both Democratic and Republican registration are in decline.

See also
 Government of Massachusetts
 Elections in Massachusetts
 Political party strength in Massachusetts
 Law of Massachusetts
 List of politics by U.S. state

Notes

References

External links

 
 Elections in Mass on U.S. Election Atlas website
 Election results and OurCampaigns.com

 
History of Massachusetts